Schwarzwald-Baar is an electoral constituency (German: Wahlkreis) represented in the Bundestag. It elects one member via first-past-the-post voting. Under the current constituency numbering system, it is designated as constituency 286. It is located in southwestern Baden-Württemberg, comprising the district of Schwarzwald-Baar-Kreis and southeastern parts of the Ortenaukreis district.

Schwarzwald-Baar was created for the 1980 federal election. Since 2013, it has been represented by Thorsten Frei of the Christian Democratic Union (CDU).

Geography
Schwarzwald-Baar is located in southwestern Baden-Württemberg. As of the 2021 federal election, it comprises the district of Schwarzwald-Baar-Kreis and the municipalities of Gutach (Schwarzwaldbahn), Hausach, Hornberg, Oberwolfach, Wolfach from the Ortenaukreis district.

History
Schwarzwald-Baar was created in 1980. In the 1980 through 1998 elections, it was constituency 190 in the numbering system. In the 2002 and 2005 elections, it was number 287. Since the 2009 election, it has been number 286.

Originally, the constituency was coterminous with the Schwarzwald-Baar-Kreis district. It acquired its current borders in the 2002 election.

Members
The constituency has been held continuously by Christian Democratic Union (CDU) since its creation. It was first represented by Hansjörg Häfele from 1980 to 1990, followed by Meinrad Belle from 1990 to 2002. Siegfried Kauder was representative from 2002 to 2013. Thorsten Frei was elected in 2013, and re-elected in 2017 and 2021.

Election results

2021 election

2017 election

2013 election

2009 election

References

Federal electoral districts in Baden-Württemberg
1980 establishments in West Germany
Constituencies established in 1980
Schwarzwald-Baar-Kreis